Battle of Flowers can mean any of the following:

 Jersey Battle of Flowers
 Battle of Flowers Parade held yearly during Fiesta San Antonio
 Battle of flowers a fiesta held in Laredo, Cantabria, Spain
 a flower parade